Castiello de Jaca (in Aragonese: Castiello de Chaca) is a municipality located in the province of Huesca, Aragon, Spain. According to the 2004 census (INE), the municipality has a population of 198 inhabitants. It is serviced by the Jaca-Astun bus. There are 2 restaurants/bars. Recent developments have seen the size of the town increase greatly.

Villages
Aratorés

References

Municipalities in the Province of Huesca